Türkmendeňizýollary (Turkmen Seaways) is a state-owned operator of sea-ways and seaports in Turkmenistan. The company operates Turkmenbashi International Seaport. The company belongs to the State Service of Maritime and River Transportation of Turkmenistan.

See also 
 Transport in Turkmenistan
 Turkmen Riverways

References

Transport in Turkmenistan